The Opa-locka Bank (also known as the First Baptist Church) is a historic bank in Opa-locka, Florida. It is located at 940 Caliph Street. On May 19, 1983, it was added to the U.S. National Register of Historic Places.

This property is part of the Opa-locka Thematic Resource Area, a multiple property submission to the National Register.

References

External links

 Dade County listings at National Register of Historic Places
 Opa Locka Bank Building at Florida's Office of Cultural and Historical Programs

National Register of Historic Places in Miami-Dade County, Florida
Opa-locka, Florida
Bank buildings on the National Register of Historic Places in Florida